The 1983 season was the Chicago Bears' 64th in the National Football League, and their second under head coach Mike Ditka. The team improved from their 3–6 record from 1982 to finish at 8–8, but to failed to make the playoffs for the fourth consecutive season. Jim McMahon was the quarterback, who completed 175 of 295 pass attempts. The Bears 1983 NFL Draft class was ranked #3 in NFL Top 10s greatest draft classes.

1983 NFL Draft

Preseason 
The Bears were predicted to finish 7–9 and fourth in the division by Paul Zimmerman. Their prized new weapon would be Willie Gault. Dennis McKinnon (signed as an undrafted free agent by the Bears in 1983) would also play a key role in the receiving corps and Jimbo Covert would help open bigger holes for Walter Payton but it was felt they were a few offensive lineman and a tight end away from being effective.  The defense would be led by All-Pro Dan Hampton and new defensive backs Mike Richardson and Dave Duerson.  The Bears started 1983 by losing 7 of their first 10, but won 5 of their last 6 to finish 8–8.  The Bears would go 71–18 in regular season games from November 13, 1983, through October 2, 1989.

Regular season

Schedule

Game summaries

Week 1: vs. Atlanta Falcons

Week 2 vs Tampa Bay Buccaneers 

CHI: Mike Hartenstine 2.0 sacks, Terry Schmidt INT

Week 3: at New Orleans Saints

Week 4: at Baltimore Colts

Week 5: vs. Denver Broncos

Week 8: at Philadelphia Eagles

Week 9: vs. Detroit Lions

Week 11: vs. Philadelphia Eagles

Week 12: at Tampa Bay Buccaneers

Week 13: vs. San Francisco 49ers

Week 14: at Green Bay Packers

Week 15: at Minnesota Vikings

Week 16 vs. Packers

Standings

Roster and staff

Staff

Roster

References

External links 

 1983 Chicago Bears Season at www.bearshistory.com

Chicago Bears
Chicago Bears seasons
Chicago